The Magni M-24 Orion is an Italian sport autogyro, seating two side-by-side in an enclosed cabin. It was designed and produced by Magni Gyro srl of Besnate.

Design and development
Magni Gyro currently produces five sport autogyro models, all with similar pod and low boom, pusher engine layouts and the M-24 Orion have side by side seating and an enclosed cabin. It has a steel airframe with a carbon fibre cabin and engine-enclosing pod.  Transparent, top hinged doors on either side give access to the two seats, which are slightly staggered to make the most of the cabin width.  The 2-bladed rotor, mounted on a mast above the pod, is of composite construction.

An 85 kW (114 hp) Rotax 914ULS flat four engine is mounted at cabin-top height and drives a 3-bladed pusher propeller. Below it, the slender flat-sided boom carries the fibreglass empennage, which consists of a swept horizontal stabilizer with end-plate fins and a larger, central, fin and rudder.  The Orion has a tricycle undercarriage with the faired mainwheels, fitted with brakes, on spring cantilever legs.  The nosewheel is unfaired.

The Orion's immediate precursor is the XM-23 Orion, which first flew on 1 February 2007, but both share many components with the tandem, open cockpit M-16 and M-22.

Operational history
 
The Orion was first seen in public in August 2008 and a pre-production run of 10 aircraft was initiated that autumn, with full-scale production starting in 2009.

By mid-2010 there were 11 Orions on the mainland European (Russian excluded) registers, the majority in France. UK type approval was reached in 2010, 4 aircraft are currently (November 2010) on the UK register, and at least one on Canadian register.

Variants
M-16 Tandem Trainer
tandem open two seat autogyro
M-22 Voyager
touring version of the M-16
M-23 Orion
one-off enclosed side-by-side development of the M-16 series

M-24 Orion
production version of the M-23 Orion
M-26
incremental development of the M-16 series

Specifications

References

External links

M-24 Orion
Single-engined pusher autogyros
2000s Italian sport aircraft